Giorgi Lomaia (born 8 August 1979 in Tbilisi) is a retired Georgian football goalkeeper.

Career
He spent the 2006 season playing for Russian Premier League side FC Luch-Energia Vladivostok, but in late January 2007 he moved  to German 2. Bundesliga side FC Carl Zeiss Jena on a short-term deal until the end of the 2006–07 season. He left Jena in June 2007 and joined FC Karpaty Lviv in Ukraine.

He made his debut for the Georgian national team in 1998 and has been capped 25 times for the team as of 2006. In July 2007 Lomaia was loaned from FC Carl Zeiss Jena to Ukrainian side FC Karpaty Lviv. Having played two matches in Lviv, Lomaia departed due to the club's dissatisfaction with his physical conditions.

International career
In International football, Lomaia has been the first choice goalkeeper in UEFA Euro 2008 qualifying with seven appearances.

In 2006 FIFA World Cup qualification (UEFA), he took the first choice place from Akaki Devadze.

In UEFA Euro 2004 qualifying with eight appearances, he took the first choice place from Davit Gvaramadze.

Personal
He is the brother of Davit Lomaia.

References

External links
Profile on Inter Baku's Official Site 

Giorgi Lomaia at Footballdatabase

1979 births
Living people
Footballers from Georgia (country)
Expatriate footballers from Georgia (country)
Georgia (country) international footballers
FC Dinamo Tbilisi players
FC Spartak Moscow players
FC Khimki players
FC Luch Vladivostok players
FC Carl Zeiss Jena players
FC Karpaty Lviv players
Shamakhi FK players
Russian Premier League players
Ukrainian Premier League players
2. Bundesliga players
Expatriate footballers in Russia
Expatriate footballers in Germany
Expatriate footballers in Ukraine
Expatriate sportspeople from Georgia (country) in Ukraine
Footballers from Tbilisi
Expatriate sportspeople from Georgia (country) in Azerbaijan
Expatriate footballers in Azerbaijan
Association football goalkeepers